is a Japanese sprinter. He competed in the men's 200 metres, the men's 4 x 100 meters relay, and the men's 4 x 400 meters relay events at the 1988 Summer Olympics.

References

1964 births
Living people
Japanese male sprinters
Olympic male sprinters
Olympic athletes of Japan
Place of birth missing (living people)
Athletes (track and field) at the 1988 Summer Olympics
Asian Games gold medalists for Japan
Asian Games medalists in athletics (track and field)
Athletes (track and field) at the 1986 Asian Games
Medalists at the 1986 Asian Games
Japan Championships in Athletics winners